Baron Dorchester was a title that was created twice in British history, once in the Peerage of Great Britain and once in the Peerage of the United Kingdom. The first creation came in the Peerage of Great Britain on 21 August 1786 when the soldier and administrator Sir Guy Carleton was made Lord Dorchester, Baron of Dorchester, in the County of Oxford. He was succeeded by his grandson, the second Baron. He was the only son of the Hon. Christopher Carleton, third son of the first Baron. The second Baron died unmarried at an early age and was succeeded by his first cousin, the third Baron. He was the only son of the Hon. George Carleton, fourth son of the first Baron. He had no sons and was succeeded by his first cousin, the fourth Baron. He was the only son of the Reverend and Hon. Richard Carleton, seventh son of the first Baron. The fourth Baron was a Colonel in the Coldstream Guards. He was childless, and the title became extinct upon his death on 30 November 1897.

The title was revived on 2 August 1899 when the Honourable Henrietta Anne Carleton was made Baroness Dorchester, of Dorchester, in the County of Oxford, in the Peerage of the United Kingdom. She was the elder daughter of the third Baron of the first creation. She was the wife of, firstly, Francis Paynton Pigott and, secondly, of Major-General Richard Langford Leir. In 1899, she assumed by Royal licence the surname of Carleton. She was succeeded by her son from her first marriage, the second Baron. He was a soldier and fought in the Second Boer War and the First World War. He had two daughters but no sons, and on his death in 1963, the title became extinct for the second time.

As indicated by the territorial designations, the titles referred to Dorchester in Oxfordshire (also known as Dorchester-on-Thames) and not to the more famous Dorchester, county town of Dorset.

Barons Dorchester; first creation (1786)
Guy Carleton, 1st Baron Dorchester (1724–1808)
The Hon. Christopher Carleton (1775–1806)
Arthur Henry Carleton, 2nd Baron Dorchester (1805–1826)
Guy Carleton, 3rd Baron Dorchester (1811–1875)
Dudley Wilmot Carleton, 4th Baron Dorchester (1822–1897)

Barons Dorchester; second creation (1899)
Henrietta Anne Carleton, 1st Baroness Dorchester  (1846–1925)    
Dudley Massey Pigott Carleton, 2nd Baron Dorchester (1876–1963)

Family tree

See also
Marquess of Dorchester
Earl of Dorchester
Viscount Dorchester

References

Attribution

External links

Extinct baronies in the Peerage of Great Britain
Extinct baronies in the Peerage of the United Kingdom
Noble titles created in 1786
Noble titles created in 1899